TSB Union is a union parishad in Rupsa Upazila of Khulna District, in Khulna Division, Bangladesh.

Education

Higher secondary schools 	
 Kajdia Collegiate School
 Patharghata Secondary School
 Kajdia Secondary Girls' School
 Kishore Kollan Secondary School
 Home of Joy School

Madrasahs
 Khadijatul Kubra (R) Mahila Madrasah
 Rupsa Darussunntat Dakhil Madrasah 	
 Tilak Siddiqui-e Akbar Dakhil Madrasa

References

Unions of Rupsa Upazila
Populated places in Khulna District